Courtney Shanade Salter (born March 26, 1991), known professionally as Ari Lennox, is an American R&B singer from Washington, D.C. She is the first female artist to be signed to J. Cole's record label, Dreamville Records. She began gaining recognition after the release of her first EP Pho (2016) on the label. That same year, she made an uncredited guest appearance on  Cole's song "Change". Lennox's debut studio album Shea Butter Baby followed in 2019.

Lennox has also been featured on the Dreamville compilation albums Revenge of the Dreamers II (2015), and Revenge of the Dreamers III (2019), the latter of which debuted at number one on the Billboard 200 chart and earned Lennox a Grammy Award nomination for Best Rap Album. In 2021, Lennox earned her first entries on the Billboard Hot 100 with her single "Pressure", and her feature on "Unloyal" by Summer Walker.

Early life 
Courtney Shanade Salter was born on March 26, 1991, in Washington, D.C. to Gloria Salter and Shane Salter and spent her formative years in the DMV area. She attended Wilson High School and Duke Ellington School of the Arts. Her stage name was influenced by Mary Lennox, a character in the film adaptation of The Secret Garden (1993).

Musical career

2012–2017: Career beginnings and Pho EP 
Ari Lennox began uploading her music on the internet in 2009. She released her debut mixtape, Five Finger Discount, and debut EP, Ariography, in 2013. In 2014, she independently released the single "Bound". On July 21, 2015, she was featured on Omen's album Elephant Eyes on the track "Sweat it Out". Later that year, her music was circulating around the Dreamville team, as J. Cole wanted her to work with him on some references for Rihanna.

On December 8, it was announced that she was signed to Dreamville Records. She made an appearance on the collaborative album Revenge of the Dreamers II, on the track "Backseat" with Cozz. On October 21, 2016, she released her debut EP titled Pho. Ari Lennox later appeared on J. Cole's song "Change", and performed as an opening act on the 4 Your Eyez Only Tour during 2017.

2018–2020: Shea Butter Baby 
In  2018, she went on to guest feature on two songs with her label-mates: EarthGang on "Nothing but the Best", and Bas on "Icarus". On July 16, 2018, Ari Lennox released the first single, "Whipped Cream", from her debut album, Shea Butter Baby with an accompanied music video on September 5. On November 9, she released two more singles called "40 Shades of Choke" and "Grampa". On November 13, she then released two more singles called "No One" and "Pedigree". She then appeared on the Creed II soundtrack with Cole on a track entitled "Shea Butter Baby" on November 16, and released as a single on February 26, 2019, for her debut album of the same name. The track was accompanied by a music video on February 20, 2019, and surpassed 3 million views via YouTube within the first week. In December 2018, she was a supporting act on the From East Atlanta With Love Tour with 6LACK.

On March 27, 2019, she announced her first headlining tour, with the first leg beginning on May 12 and ending on June 14 in her hometown Washington, D.C. Her debut album, Shea Butter Baby was released on May 7, 2019. Several times on this tour she was opened by Baby Rose and Mikhala Jené. She also went on the road with Lizzo on the Cuz I Love You Too Tour from July to October. The second leg of her headlining tour was in Europe, during December 2019. In February 2020, Ari Lennox was placed on BET's "Future 40" list, which is a list of "40 of the most inspiring and innovative vanguards who are redefining what it means to be unapologetically young, gifted & black". She released multiple of singles in 2020 including "Bussit", "Chocolate Pomegranate", and a cover of "If You Want Me to Stay", as well as guest appearances and collaborations with Kiana Ledé, Skip Marley, 6lack, and Spillage Village, among others.

2021–present: Age/Sex/Location and Away Message 
On September 10, 2021, Ari Lennox released the single "Pressure", produced by Jermaine Dupri and Bryan-Michael Cox. The song became her first solo charting single on the Billboard Hot 100, her first Radio No. 1 single, and reached number 3 on R&B/Hip-Hop Airplay. On March 31, 2022, she appeared on the Dreamville compilation D-Day: A Gangsta Grillz Mixtape, on the songs "Coming Down" and "Blackberry Sap". On August 12, Ari Lennox released her second single, "Hoodie", and announced the title and release date for her second studio album, Age/Sex/Location. On August 31, she released the surprise EP Away Message, including the single "Queen Space" featuring Summer Walker.

Artistry 
Ari Lennox describes her own voice as "vulnerable but soulful; imperfect but pretty". Her voice has been compared to Erykah Badu. Referencing her artistry, she explains: "Sometimes women are put in this box where we're only supposed to talk about certain things, I want to be braver and riskier. I think people want to hear that kind of honesty and frankness." Ari Lennox said in multiple interviews that she is inspired by 90s and 2000s R&B singers such as Mariah Carey, Erykah Badu, D'Angelo, Bilal, Whitney Houston, Aaliyah, Lauryn Hill, Amerie, Ciara, SWV, Mary J Blige, among many others, and soul singer Minnie Riperton. In an interview with The Fader, she also mentioned her admiration of Kanye West and how she found multiple other artists through him. The Gateway described Ari Lennox's sound as "successfully blends individual slices of classic Motown, modern R&B, and new-age soul into one seamless product."

Discography

Studio albums

Extended plays

Mixtapes

Compilation albums

Singles

As lead artist

As featured artist

Promotional singles

Other charted songs

Guest appearances

Notes

Filmography

Tours 
Headlining
 Shea Butter Baby Tour (2019)
 Age/Sex/Location Tour (2023)

Supporting
 4 Your Eyez Only Tour  (2017)
 From East Atlanta With Love Tour  (2018)
 Cuz I Love You Too Tour  (2019)

Awards and nominations

References 

1991 births
Living people
Dreamville Records artists
21st-century African-American women singers
African-American women singer-songwriters
21st-century American singers
American neo soul singers
21st-century American women singers
Singer-songwriters from Washington, D.C.